Charles George Harper (1863–1943) was an English author and illustrator. Born in London, England, Harper wrote many self-illustrated travel books, exploring the regions, roads, coastlines, literary connections, old inns etc. of Britain. In later life, he lived in Petersham.

Aside from the some 170 topographical works, he also wrote a few books on drawing and its techniques, including English Pen Artists of To-day (1892) and A Practical Handbook of Drawing for Modern Methods of Reproduction (1894), as well as an anti-feminist polemic, Revolted Woman; past, present, and to come (1894), and a satirical novel, Hearts Do Not Break: a Tale of the Lower Slopes (1896), attacking logrolling among the London literary set.

Critical assessment
R. E. D. Sketchley's English Book-Illustration of To-Day (1903) characterised Harper's travel books as "… written and drawn with spirited observation. His drawing is not so picturesque as his writing. It has reticence and justness of expression that would not serve in relating tales of the road, but which, together with a sense of colour and of what is pictorial, combine to form an effective and frequently distinctive style of illustration".

N. W. Webster's article "The English traveller"' (1974) describes him as "more a capable draughtsman than a creative artist, although his books would lose much without his delightful sketches".

Published works (selected)
Revolted Woman: past, present, and to come (London, Elkin Mathews, 1894)
The Marches of Wales: notes and impressions on the Welsh borders, from the Severn Sea to the Sands o' Dee (London, Chapman & Hall, 1894)
Hearts Do Not Break: a Tale of the Lower Slopes (London, Kegan Paul & Co., 1896)
The Exeter Road: the story of the west of England highway (Chapman & Hall, 1899)
The Holyhead Road (Chapman & Hall, 1902)
Cycle Rides Round London (CHAPMAN & HALL, 1902)
The Hardy Country: literary landmarks of the Wessex novels (London, A. & C. Black, 1904).
The Ingoldsby Country: literary landmarks of the "Ingoldsby legends" (London, A. & C. Black, 1904)
The Old Inns of Old England – Vol. 1, Vol. 2 (Chapman & Hall, 1906).
The Hastings Road, and the "Happy Springs of Tunbridge" (Chapman & Hall, Ltd. 1906)
Haunted Houses: Tales of the Supernatural: With Some Account of Hereditary Curses and Family Legends (1907)
The South Devon Coast (Chapman & Hall, 1907)
The North Devon Coast (Chapman & Hall, 1908)
The Somerset Coast (Chapman & Hall, 1909).
Thames Valley Villages – Vol. 1, Vol. 2 (Chapman & Hall, 1910)
Summer Days in Shakespeare Land (J. Pott & Co., 1913).
The Kentish Coast (Chapman & Hall, 1914)
The Dover Road: annals of an ancient turnpike (Cecil Palmer, 1922)
The Great North Road, the old mail road to Scotland (Charles Palmer, 1922).
 On the Road in Holland: notes and impressions in the quaint country of dykes and canals (Cecil Palmer, 1922)

Further reading

References

External links
 
 
 
Chronological list of books by C G Harper (booksandwriters.co.uk)

English travel writers
English non-fiction writers
English illustrators
1863 births
1943 deaths
English male non-fiction writers